Curtis Lenard Weathers (born September 16, 1956) is a former American football linebacker in the National Football League. He was drafted by the Cleveland Browns in the ninth round of the 1979 NFL Draft. He played college football at Mississippi.

1956 births
Living people
Players of American football from Memphis, Tennessee
American football linebackers
American football tight ends
Ole Miss Rebels football players
Cleveland Browns players